Tumba is a mountain peak found in south-east Kosovo. Tumba is part of the long ridge of the Šar Mountains. It is in the northern part of the range and its peak is just above the Livadh Lake. It is next to the Maja Livadh.

See also
Geography of Kosovo
List of mountains in Kosovo

Notes

References

Mountains of Kosovo
Šar Mountains
Two-thousanders of Kosovo